Suromna is a rural locality (a selo) in Bogolyubovskoye Rural Settlement, Suzdalsky District, Vladimir Oblast, Russia. The population was 646 as of 2010. There are 32 streets.

Geography 
Suromna is located on the Sungir River, 34 km south of Suzdal (the district's administrative centre) by road. Bogolyubovo is the nearest rural locality.

References 

Rural localities in Suzdalsky District
Vladimirsky Uyezd